The 1984 United States presidential election in California took place on November 6, 1984, as part of the 1984 United States presidential election. State voters chose 47 representatives, or electors, to the Electoral College, who voted for president and vice president.

California voted for the Republican incumbent and former California Governor, Ronald Reagan, in a landslide over the Democratic challenger, former Minnesota Senator and Vice President Walter Mondale. Reagan easily won his home state with a comfortable 16.24% margin and carried all but five counties. Despite this, California's margin was 1.97% more Democratic than the nation as a whole.

Reagan is the last Republican to carry the following California counties in a presidential election: Contra Costa, Humboldt, Lake, Los Angeles, Mendocino, San Mateo, Santa Clara, Solano and Sonoma. No Republican since Reagan has come close to matching his performance in the San Francisco Bay Area, and he is also the last candidate from either party to carry every county they won in the state by a majority of the vote in those counties (more than 50%). This is also the most recent occasion where a Republican won more than thirty percent of the vote in San Francisco, won the state by double digits (George H. W. Bush would win the state by a 3-point margin in 1988), and won every county of Greater Southern California.

As a result of this election, San Francisco and Alameda were the only two counties in California to have never been carried by Reagan in either of his campaigns for president or for Governor of California (Reagan also did not carry Yolo County in any of his presidential campaigns; however, he carried the county in his 1966 gubernatorial campaign).

Reagan became the first Republican ever to win the White House without Marin or Santa Cruz Counties.

Results

Results by county

References

California
1984
1984 California elections